The Mania Spyder was a Swedish kit car company in Falköping selling a sports roadster based on either VW Beetle or spaceframe chassis. They advertised that a formula spaceframe made for motorcycle engines would be available in spring 2001. It was designed by the automotive designer and guitar builder Ulf Bolumlid of Design by Ulf.  Over 50 examples of the Mania have been sold, a Swedish record for an own design kit-car.

External links 
Design by Ulf
Mania Spyder
 My Mania page
 Wolf - En ny svensk sportbil
 Mania kit car sold by Dalhems

Defunct motor vehicle manufacturers of Sweden
Sports cars
Kit car manufacturers